Dassel is a city in Meeker County, Minnesota, United States. The population was 1,469 at the 2010 census.

History
Dassel was platted in 1869, and named for Bernard Dassel, a railroad official. A post office has been in operation at Dassel since 1869. Dassel was incorporated in 1878.

Geography

U.S. Highway 12 and Minnesota State Highway 15 are two of the main routes in the city.

Education
Dassel Elementary was recognized as one of 219 public schools in the nation as a 2012 National Blue Ribbon School based on academic excellence. In Bloomberg Business Week's list "The Best Places to Raise Your Kids 2011", Dassel finished as runner-up for Minnesota, behind Cokato.

Demographics

2000 census
As of the census of 2000, there were 1,233 people, 515 households, and 313 families residing in the city. The racial makeup of the city was 97.57% White, 0.16% Native American, 0.41% Asian, 1.62% from other races, and 0.24% from two or more races. Hispanic or Latino of any race were 1.87% of the population. 30.8% were of German, 25.6% Swedish, 11.4% Norwegian, 8.6% Finnish, and 6.7% Irish ancestry.

There were 515 households, out of which 29.3% had children under the age of 18 living with them, 52.0% were married couples living together, 5.2% had a female householder with no husband present, and 39.2% were non-families. 35.3% of all households were made up of individuals, and 19.0% had someone living alone who was 65 years of age or older.  The average household size was 2.28 and the average family size was 2.97.

In the city, the population was spread out, with 24.0% under the age of 18, 7.5% from 18 to 24, 27.1% from 25 to 44, 19.1% from 45 to 64, and 22.4% who were 65 years of age or older.  The median age was 39 years. For every 100 females, there were 90.0 males.  For every 100 females age 18 and over, there were 81.6 males.

The median income for a household in the city was $37,500, and the median income for a family was $48,854. Males had a median income of $30,759 versus $22,121 for females. The per capita income for the city was $17,476.  About 3.7% of families and 5.0% of the population were below the poverty line, including 2.8% of those under age 18 and 12.7% of those age 65 or over.

2010 census
As of the census of 2010, there were 1,469 people, 572 households, and 370 families residing in the city. The racial makeup of the city was 95.4% White, 0.3% African American, 1.0% Native American, 0.8% Asian, 0.5% Pacific Islander, 1.0% from other races, and 1.0% from two or more races. Hispanic or Latino of any race were 2.0% of the population.

There were 572 households, of which 31.6% had children under the age of 18 living with them, 51.2% were married couples living together, 7.9% had a female householder with no husband present, 5.6% had a male householder with no wife present, and 35.3% were non-families. 30.8% of all households were made up of individuals, and 14.8% had someone living alone who was 65 years of age or older. The average household size was 2.46 and the average family size was 3.10.

The median age in the city was 35.9 years. 27.1% of residents were under the age of 18; 8.6% were between the ages of 18 and 24; 24.8% were from 25 to 44; 19.6% were from 45 to 64; and 19.9% were 65 years of age or older. The gender makeup of the city was 48.3% male and 51.7% female.

Government and politics
The mayor of Dassel is Ronald D. Hungerford, a veteran and former teacher at Dassel-Cokato High School. City council members include Sharon Asplin, Sara Nelson, Jason Benzing, and Wayne Medcraft. Terri Boese is the city clerk/treasurer. City council meetings are held the third Monday of each month at 7pm at Dassel City Hall.

Culture
Each year on Labor Day weekend, Dassel is active with Red Rooster Days, a tradition that originated in 1959.

The Universal Laboratories Building at Dassel is listed on the National Register of Historic Places.

References

External links

Dassel City Website

Cities in Minnesota
Cities in Meeker County, Minnesota
Populated places established in 1869
1869 establishments in Minnesota